Anarsia arachniota is a moth in the  family Gelechiidae. It was described by Edward Meyrick in 1925. It is found in Egypt and Palestine.

References

arachniota
Moths described in 1925
Moths of the Middle East